Hickiwan is a populated place situated in Pima County, Arizona, United States. It has been known by a plethora of names over the years, such as Hikibon, Hikiro, Hikjorn, Hikuwan, Jiquibo, Kokuli, Milpitas, Perigua, Periqua, Piriqua, and Tachitoa. The name was officially recognized as Hickiwan by a decision of the Board on Geographic Names in 1941.

Vaya Chin, also historically known as South Well during the 1930s, is located at Hickiwan. The name is derived from the O'odham term vaya chin, meaning "well's mouth".

References

Populated places in Pima County, Arizona
Tohono O'odham Nation